Mark Van Ameyde is a college baseball coach who is currently the pitching coach for the Michigan State Spartans baseball team. He previously served as the head baseball coach of the Eastern Michigan Eagles baseball program. He was named to that position prior to the 2015 season.

Early years
Van Amyede was raised in Novi, Michigan, and attended Novi High School.

Playing career
Van Ameyde began his collegiate playing career at Henry Ford Community College in 1991. In his first season, he helped lead the team to a regional championship. He also played at Henry Ford in 1992 before moving on to the NCAA Division I ranks with the Detroit Titans. Van Ameyde spent two seasons at Detroit, earning all-conference and team MVP honors in his final season.

He graduated from Detroit in 1996 with a degree in communications.

Coaching career
Van Ameyde began his coaching career as the head coach at Saint Mary's College. He helped start up the baseball program at Saint Mary's. Following two seasons at Saint Mary's, he moved on to help his coach his alma mater of Detroit. Over four seasons with the Titans, he spent time as both hitting coach and pitching coach, as well as recruiting coordinator. He left after the 2004 season, when the program was discontinued due to budget cuts.

Following his tenure with Detroit, Van Ameyde spent three seasons as an assistant at Georgetown, serving as pitching coach and recruiting coordinator. In 2008, he served as an assistant at Eastern Michigan, where he helped lead the team to the NCAA Tournament. He also coached Matt Shoemaker, who current plays for the Los Angeles Angels of Anaheim.

After the 2008 season, Van Ameyde joined Eastern Michigan head coach Jake Boss on his staff at Michigan State. Over his six seasons with the Spartans, they made appearance in an NCAA Regional (2012), won a conference title (2011), and made three appearances in the Big Ten Conference Tournament.

On July 15, 2014, Van Ameyde returned to Eastern Michigan as head coach, his first head coaching position at the Division I level.

Head coaching record
The following is a table of Van Ameyde's yearly records as an NCAA head baseball coach.

References

Living people
Baseball coaches from Michigan
Georgetown Hoyas baseball coaches
Eastern Michigan Eagles baseball coaches
Henry Ford Hawks baseball players
Michigan State Spartans baseball coaches
Detroit Mercy Titans baseball players
People from Novi, Michigan
Year of birth missing (living people)